The following lists events that happened during 1954 in Cambodia.

Incumbents 
 Monarch: Norodom Sihanouk
 Prime Minister: 
 until 7 April: Chan Nak
 7 April-18 April: Norodom Sihanouk
 starting 18 April: Penn Nouth

Events

August
 August 1 - The First Indochina War ends with the Vietnam People's Army in North Vietnam, the Vietnamese National Army in South Vietnam, the Kingdom of Cambodia in Cambodia, and the Kingdom of Laos in Laos, emerging victorious against the French Army.

References

 
1950s in Cambodia
Years of the 20th century in Cambodia
Cambodia
Cambodia